Defence Intelligence Agency, or variations of the name, may refer to agencies in several countries, including: 

Defence Intelligence Agency (India)
Defence Intelligence Agency (Nigeria)
Defence Intelligence, United Kingdom
Defense Intelligence Agency, United States
Defense Intelligence Agency (South Korea)
Finnish Defence Intelligence Agency

See also
Intelligence agency
List of intelligence agencies (by country)
Defense intelligence (disambiguation)
National Intelligence Agency (disambiguation)
National Security Agency (disambiguation)
State Security Agency (disambiguation)